Begonia aeranthos is a species of plant in the family Begoniaceae. It is endemic to Ecuador.  Its natural habitat is subtropical or tropical moist montane forests. It is threatened by habitat loss.

References

aeranthos
Endemic flora of Ecuador
Endangered plants
Taxonomy articles created by Polbot